Viliam Karmažin (September 23, 1922 – April 10, 2018) was a Slovak composer and conductor. He was the longest-serving conductor in the world.

References

1922 births
2018 deaths
People from Hlohovec District
Slovak composers
Male composers
Slovak conductors (music)
Male conductors (music)
Czechoslovak musicians
Slovak male musicians